Romeo George (born August 16, 1988) alias RJ The DJ and Romy Jon(e)s is a Tanzanian DJ, record producer and television actor.

Career
Jons worked as music video model, appearing on music videos before starting his debut career as a disc jokey in 2010. As a music video model, Jons appeared to Diamond Platnumz's debut song Mbagala in 2010. Even though he is said to be Diamond Platnumz cousin and his closest male relative, he is not signed to WCB wasafi, a label owned by  Diamond Platnumz, he works as a freelancer DJ.  Expansion to his music career enabled him to perform to the whole of East Africa.

In 2020, he teamed with the likes of Marioo, Sho Madjozi, Lava Lava, Khaligraph Jones, Vanessa Mdee and Morgan Heritage on his first ever studio album called 'Changes'.

Apart from his solo works,  Jons works as an official DJ of Diamond Platnumz also serves as the vice president of WCB Wasafi music label.

Filmography

Discography
Album
2020: Changes
Singles
Bang ft Khaligraph Jones, Chin Bees & Rayvanny
Ready ft Morgan Heritage & Jose Chameleone
Cheza ft Christian Bella & BM
Take me away ft Vanessa Mdee & Ycee
Kifolongo ft Khadija Kopa, Mbosso & Lava Lava
Hapo ft Marioo
Changes ft Alice & Fid Q
Muonjeshe ft Mimi Mars, Young Lunya & G Nako
Too Much ft Sho Madjozi & Marioo
We don't care ft Rayvanny & Meddy
Sexy Mama ft Lava Lava

Extended Playlist (EP)
2022:The Weekend
Singles
Superstar ft Ntosh Gazi & Mabantu
Blind love ft Dash
I love you ft Lilly
Mama ft Isha Mashauzi & Ucho
The Weekend ft Kidylax

References

1988 births
FL Studio users
Living people
Electronic dance music DJs
Deep house musicians
Tanzanian musicians